Mario Álvarez (born 19 November 1985 in Oviedo, Asturias, Spain) is a Spanish singer. He is the winner of seventh series of Operación Triunfo in 2009, a Spanish version of Star Academy.

Career
At nine, he started taking part in various entertainment castings. In 2000 when he was just 15, he became the vocalist for the punk band StaticDasters. In September 2004, he joined the Tekila orchestra. He also registered at Conservatorio de Música de Oviedo studying music and Escuela de Arte Dramático de Gijón studying acting.

In 2009, he applied for casting of musical Nino Bravo. Later on the same year was accepted as one of the finalists of Operación Triunfo. He won with a narrow margin getting 50.5% of the votes.

After touring with the other finalists. His debut single from the album is "Voy a ser yo". Starting 2014, he became a host in Orquesta Principado XXI season on Televisión del Principado de Asturias (TPA).

In 2016, he joined Orquesta Panorama.

Discography

Albums
2009: Música (Operación Triunfo collective album)
2010: Voy a ser yo

EPs
2012: Tiempo al Tiempo
2013: Me equivoqué

Singles
2011: "Voy a ser yo"
2012: "Tiempo al tiempo"
2013: "Me equivoqué"
2018: "Entre tu y yo"

References

External links
Mario Álvarez Fan Club website

1985 births
Living people
Spanish pop singers
Star Academy participants
Star Academy winners
Singers from Asturias
People from Oviedo
Operación Triunfo contestants
21st-century Spanish singers
21st-century Spanish male singers